This is an incomplete list of people who have served as Lord Lieutenant of Norfolk. Since 1689, all Lord Lieutenants have also been Custos Rotulorum of Norfolk.
William Parr, 1st Marquess of Northampton, 1549 –
Thomas Radclyffe, 3rd Earl of Sussex 1557–1559
Thomas Howard, 4th Duke of Norfolk 1559–1572
Henry Carey, 1st Baron Hunsdon 3 July 1585 – 23 July 1596
Henry Howard, 1st Earl of Northampton 16 July 1605 – 16 June 1614
Thomas Howard, 21st Earl of Arundel 18 April 1615 – 1642 jointly with
Henry Howard, Lord Maltravers 28 February 1633 – 1642
Interregnum
Thomas Wriothesley, 4th Earl of Southampton 24 September 1660 – 19 August 1661
Horatio Townshend, 1st Viscount Townshend 19 August 1661 – 6 March 1676
Sir Robert Paston, 1st Earl of Yarmouth 6 March 1676 – 8 March 1683
Henry Howard, 7th Duke of Norfolk 5 April 1683 – 2 April 1701
Charles Townshend, 2nd Viscount Townshend 26 May 1701 – 30 April 1713
James Butler, 2nd Duke of Ormonde 30 April 1713 – 30 October 1714
Charles Townshend, 2nd Viscount Townshend 30 October 1714 – 25 June 1730
Charles Townshend, Lord Lynn 25 June 1730 – 13 December 1739
John Hobart, 1st Earl of Buckinghamshire 13 December 1739 – 22 September 1756
George Walpole, 3rd Earl of Orford 29 June 1757 – 5 December 1791
George Townshend, 1st Marquess Townshend 24 February 1792 – 14 September 1807
William Assheton Harbord, 2nd Baron Suffield 11 March 1808 – 1 August 1821
John Wodehouse, 2nd Baron Wodehouse 1 November 1821 – 31 May 1846
Thomas Coke, 2nd Earl of Leicester 28 July 1846 – 3 September 1906
Thomas Coke, 3rd Earl of Leicester 3 September 1906 – 1 May 1929
Russell James Colman 1 May 1929 – 14 March 1944
Thomas Coke, 4th Earl of Leicester 14 March 1944 – 21 August 1949
Sir Edmund Bacon, 13th and 14th Baronet 30 September 1949 – 1978
Sir Timothy Colman, KG 30 March 1978 – 19 September 2004
Sir Richard Jewson 19 September 2004 – 5 August 2019
Lady Dannatt, MBE 5 August 2019 – present

Deputy lieutenants
A deputy lieutenant of Norfolk is commissioned by the Lord Lieutenant of Norfolk. Deputy lieutenants support the work of the lord-lieutenant. There can be several deputy lieutenants at any time, depending on the population of the county. Their appointment does not terminate with the changing of the lord-lieutenant, but they usually retire at age 75.

18th Century
15 February 1793: John Micklethwait, Esq.
15 February 1793: John Marcon, Esq.
15 February 1793: Francis Daltonm, Esq.
15 February 1793: Edward Parry, Esq.
15 February 1793: James Burkin Burroughes, Esq.
15 February 1793: Charles Collyer, Esq.
15 February 1793: Thomas Fisher, Esq.
15 February 1793: Edmund Rolfe, Esq.
15 February 1793: James Coldham, Esq.
15 February 1793: John Mann, Gent.
6 June 1798: Lieutenant Colonel Thomas Halton, Esq.
6 June 1798: Thomas Blake, Esq.
6 June 1798: John Holley, Esq.
6 June 1798: The Rev. Robert Thomlinson
6 June 1798: Anthony Hammond, Esq.

References
 

Norfolk
Lord-Lieutenants of Norfolk
History of Norfolk